Kay Thomassen (born 3 June 1987) is a Dutch footballer who plays as a defensive midfielder for VV Ewijk in the eighth-tier Derde Klasse.

He most notably had a stint at Achilles '29 in the Dutch Eerste Divisie. He also played first team football for Quick 1888 and Juliana '31.

References

1987 births
Living people
Dutch footballers
Association football defenders
Eerste Divisie players
Achilles '29 players
Footballers from Nijmegen
Quick 1888 players
Juliana '31 players